Thomas Clarke Theaker (February 4, 1812 – July 16, 1883) was an American politician who served one term as U.S. Congressman from 1859 to 1861. He also served as commissioner of the United States Patent Office from 1865 to 1868.

Biography 
Theaker was a native of York, Pennsylvania, but moved to Bridgeport, Ohio, in 1830, where he became a wheelwright and machinist.

Elected as a Republican to represent the Seventeenth Congressional District of Ohio in the Thirty-Sixth Congress, he failed to win re-election in 1860, but was appointed to a seat on the U.S. Patent Office's Board of Appeals.

On August 15, 1865, he was appointed commissioner of the Patent Office, a post he held until his resignation in January 1868.

Sources

1812 births
1883 deaths
Politicians from York, Pennsylvania
People from Bridgeport, Ohio
United States Commissioners of Patents
19th-century American politicians
Republican Party members of the United States House of Representatives from Ohio